Afro-Asians, African Asians or simply Black Asians, often referred to as "Blasians", are persons of mixed Asian and African ancestry. Historically, Afro-Asian populations have been marginalised as a result of human migration and social conflict.

Africa

Democratic Republic of the Congo

Katanga Afro-Japanese
During the 1970s, an increased demand for copper and cobalt attracted Japanese investments in the mineral-rich southeastern region of Katanga Province. Over a 10-year period, more than 1,000 Japanese miners relocated to the region, confined to a strictly male-only camp. Arriving without family or spouses, the men often sought social interaction outside the confines of their camps. In search of intimacy with the opposite sex, resulting in cohabitation, the men openly engaged in interracial dating and relationships, a practice embraced by the local society. As a result, a number of Japanese miners fathered children with native Congolese women. However, most of the mixed race infants resulting from these unions died, soon after birth. Multiple testimonies of local people suggest that the infants were poisoned by a Japanese lead physician and nurse working at the local mining hospital. Subsequently, the circumstances would have brought the miners shame as most of them already had families back in their native Japan. The practice forced many native Katangan mothers to hide their children by not reporting to the hospital to give birth.

Today, fifty Afro-Japanese have formed an association of Katanga Infanticide survivors. The organization has hired legal counsel seeking a formal investigation into the killings. The group submitted an official inquiry to both the Congolese and Japanese governments, to no avail. Issues specific to this group include having no documentation of their births since not having been born in the local hospital spared their lives. The total number of survivors is unknown.

Equatorial Guinea
The mid-19th century saw about 500 Chinese laborers and indentured servants, along with a handful from India stealthily imported to the island of Fernando Po through the once Portuguese owned Macau. While most of these servants returned to their homelands at the end of their servitude, a few remained, settling and marrying into the local population. One example is immigrant East Indian laborer Francisco Kashu Alimama who remained in Moka after the death of his last living relative. He married the daughter of one of the last Bubi kings, producing several Indo-Equatoguinean children.

Kenya

Zheng He's fleet
In 1999, Nicholas Kristof of The New York Times reported a surprising encounter on the island of Pate, where he found a village of stone huts. He talked to an elderly man living in the village who said that he was a descendant of Chinese explorers who were shipwrecked there centuries before. The Chinese had supposedly traded with the locals and had even loaded giraffes onto their ship to take back to China. However, the Chinese ran aground on a nearby reef. Kristof found evidence that confirmed the man's story. Such evidence included the Asian features of the people in the village, plus Asian-looking porcelain artifacts. These descendants of Zheng He's fleet occupy both Pate and Lamu Islands. Around 400 survivors of these 20 shipwrecked Chinese sailors settled and married with local women.

New immigration
New interest in Kenya's natural resources has attracted over $1 billion of investment from Chinese firms. This has propelled new development in Kenya's infrastructure with Chinese firms bringing in their own male workers to build roads. The temporary residents usually arrive without their spouses and families. Thus, a rise of incidents involving local college-aged females has resulted in an increased rate of Afro-Chinese infant births to single Kenyan mothers.

In Kenya there is a trend of the following influx of Chinese male workers in Kenya with a growing number of abandoned babies of Chinese men who fathered children with local women, causing concern.

Madagascar

The population of Madagascar is primarily a mixture of various degrees of Austronesian and Bantu settlers from Southeast Asia (Borneo) and Southeast Africa (primarily Mozambique), respectively. Years of intermarriages created the Malagasy people. They primarily speak Malagasy, an Austronesian language with some Bantu influences.

In the study of "The Dual Origin of the Malagasy in Island Southeast Asia and East Africa: Evidence from Maternal and Paternal Lineages" shows the Bantu maternal origin to be 38% and Paternal 51% while the Southeast Asian paternal to be 34% and maternal 62%. In the study of Malagasy, autosomal DNA shows the highlanders ethnic group like Merina are almost an even mixture of Southeast Asian and Bantu origin, while the coastal ethnic group have much higher Bantu mixture in their autosomal DNA suggesting they are mixture of new Bantu migrants and the already established highlander ethnic group. Maximum-likelihood estimates favour a scenario in which Madagascar was settled approximately 1,200 years ago by a very small group of women of approximately 30. The Malagasy people existed through intermarriages between the small founding population.

Intermarriage between native Malagasy women and Chinese men were not uncommon. Several thousand Cantonese men intermarried and cohabited with Malagasy women. 98% of the Chinese traced their origin from Guangdong, specifically the Cantonese district of Shunde. For example, the census alone in 1954 census found 1,111 "irregular" Chinese-Malagasy unions and 125 legitimate, i.e., legally married, partnerships. Most offspring were registered by their mothers under a Malagasy name.

Mauritius

Approximately 68% of the population has some Indian ancestry. About 25% of the population is Creole (of mixed French and African descent) and there are small numbers of people of Franco-Mauritian and Chinese descent.

Nigeria

Since the 1970s, Nigeria has seen a slow, but steady, increase in the immigrant Filipino population drawn by the oil industry. Established in 1973, the Philippine Barangay Society of Nigeria addresses issues specific to over 1,700 Nigerized Filipinos living in the country. This acculturation has resulted in a small but growing, number of biracial Nigerian Filipinos births. Most of these children are parented by Filipino mothers and Nigerian fathers.

Réunion

The native Kaf population has a diverse range of ancestry stemming from colonial Indian and Chinese peoples. They also descend from African slaves brought from countries like Mozambique, Guinea, Senegal, Madagascar, Tanzania and Zambia to the island.

Most population of Réunion Creoles who are of mixed ancestry and make up the majority of the population. Interracial marriages between European men and Chinese men with African women, Indian women, Chinese women, Madagascar women were also common. In 2005, a genetic study on the racially mixed people of Réunion found the following. For maternal (mitochondrial) DNA, the haplogroups are Indian (44%), East Asian (27%), European/Middle Eastern (19%) or African (10%). The Indian lineages are M2, M6 and U2i, the East Asian ones are E1, D5a, M7c, and F (E1 and M7c also found only in South East Asia and in Madagascar), the European/Middle Eastern ones are U2e, T1, J, H, and I, and the African ones are L1b1, L2a1, L3b, and L3e1.

For paternal (Y-chromosome) DNA, the haplogroups are European/Middle Eastern (85%) or East Asian (15%). The European lineages are R1b and I, the Middle Eastern one E1b1b1c (formerly E3b3) (also found in Northeast Africa), and the East Asian ones are R1a (found in many parts of the world including Europe and Central and Southern Asia but the particular sequence has been found in Asia) and O3.

Seychelles

More than 70% of the native population has Afro-Asian ancestry stemming from African, Malagasy, Indian and Chinese peoples, combined with additional British and French origins. However, the demographic is specifically proud of their African/Malagasy heritage and have formed an institute promoting their identity and cultural tolerance.

South Africa and Namibia

The Cape Coloured population descend from the indigenous Khoisan and Xhosa peoples, European immigrants and Malagasy, Ceylonese and Southeast Asian (primarily Indonesian) laborers and slaves brought by the Dutch from the mid-17th century to the late 18th century. The majority of Coloureds, particularly in the Western Cape and Northern Cape, speak Afrikaans as a first language, while those in other parts of South Africa tend to speak English as well. Coloureds with Javanese or other Indonesian ancestry may often be regarded as Cape Malay and are primarily Muslims, while the majority of Coloureds are Christian (generally Protestant) or agnostic. Due to similar social adversities experienced under the Apartheid regime from the late 1940s to the late 1980s, Coloured and indigenous South African communities generally fall under the black social category when it comes to employment and affirmative action policies.

DNA of South Africa's ethnic groups
The mtDNA study of ethnic people from South Africa shows substantial African genetic mtDNA contribution in both the Cape Malay and South African Indians. mtDNA of Cape Malay shows 10% African mtDNA contribution in their gene pool including 20% (1 in 5) of South African Indians; there appears to be no African Y-DNA contribution detected but this could be due to the fact that the sample size was small. mtDNA study also revealed that about 1 in 10 South African Black people have mtDNA lineages derived from Eurasian (3.0%) and Asian of Indian origins (7.1%).

Cape Coloureds

There is a significant genetic mixture of European, African, Indian and East/Southeast Asian DNA in the modern ethnic group of Cape Coloured. The highest genetic contribution to the Cape Coloured is from African maternal mtDNA displaying very high frequencies at 79.04%, followed by African Paternal Y-DNA frequencies at 45.18%. European Genetic contribution is the second highest after Africans with a high frequency of 37.72% from European Y-DNA but with a low contribution of European mtDNA at 4.26%. The Indian genetics also displayed significant frequencies, the mtDNA contribution stands at 13.85% and Y-DNA at 9.65% and lastly the East/Southeast Asian Y-DNA in the Cape Coloured also displayed a significant frequency at 8.54% but with a very low contribution of Southeast/East Asian mtDNA at only 1.6%, some of the Southeast Asian contributions from the Cape colored gene pool may have partially derived from both East/Southeast Asian and Malagasy who both also exhibit haplogroups O1a and O2a and B4a, B5a, F1c. The only exception of the completely Southeast/East Asian lineage in Cape Coloured are haplogroup O3-M122 (3.58%) and K-M9 (1.32%) both which are found among Chinese and Southeast Asians but not among the Malagasy.

Afro-Asian admixture is also significant in the Muslim population of South Africa. Haplogroup O-M175, East Asian male ancestry ranges in various moderate to high frequencies in the ethnic minorities of South Africa. The frequency of this haplogroup is 6.14% in the Cape colored population. 18% in Cape Coloured Muslim, 38% in Cape Indian Muslims and 10% in other Cape Other Muslim. African maternal Haplogroup L lineages it's found 47% in the Cape Cultured Muslims, 44% in Cape Malay, 14% in Indian Muslims,  20% in other Muslim population in South Africa.

Uganda

There was a widespread migration of Indians to Southeast Africa, during the time of the construction of the East African/Uganda railway. The Asian migrants married local Ugandans and gave rise to generations of Afro-Asians.

New immigration

For the past decades. Chinese male workers, investors, contractors,  traders, and entrepreneurs from China have been pouring into Uganda. In hopes of gaining residency, an increasing number of Chinese men are marrying Ugandan women to gain residency; many of them are sham marriages. A number of children of Chinese fathers and Ugandan mothers were born as a result.

An official from Uganda's directorate of citizenship and immigration control who were concerned with the marriages between Chinese men and Ugandan women, told the committee.
“But we have many who are marrying and even producing... Even our Ugandan women are accepting to [reproduce] with these men,"

The Americas

Central and South America
In Central and South America, significant numbers of Chinese first started arriving in the mid-19th century as part of the Coolie slave trade. By the mid-20th century, Cuba and Peru had the largest Chinese populations. By the end of WWII, there were considerable high numbers of Central and South America descended from local women and Chinese fathers. There are also small numbers of Central and South American residents of Asian and African descent in countries like Puerto Rico, Haiti and the Dominican Republic.

Cuba

About 120,000 Cantonese coolies, all males, entered Cuba under contract for 80 years; most did not marry, but Hung Hui (1975:80) cites there was a frequency of sexual activity between black women and Cantonese coolies. According to Osberg (1965:69) the free Chinese conducted the practice of buying slave women and freeing them expressly for marriage. In the 19th and 20th centuries, Chinese men (Cantonese) engaged in sexual activity with both White and Black Cuban women and from such relations many children were born.

In the 1920s an additional 30,000 Cantonese and small groups of Japanese also arrived; both immigrations were exclusively male and there was rapid intermarriage with white, black and mulato populations. The CIA World Factbook Cuba, in 2008, claimed a population of 114,240 Chinese-Cubans, with only 300 being pure Chinese.

In the study of genetic origin, admixture and asymmetry in maternal and paternal human lineages in Cuba, thirty-five Y-chromosome SNPs were typed in the 132 male individuals of the Cuban sample. The study does not include any people with some Chinese ancestry. All the samples were White and Black Cubans. Two out of 132 male sample belong to East Asian Haplogroup O2, which is found in significant frequencies among Cantonese people, is found in 1.5% of the Cuban population.

One of Cuba's most known Afro-Asians is the artist Wifredo Lam.

Haiti

In Haiti, there is a sizable percentage within the minority who are of Asian descent. Haiti is also home to Marabou peoples, a half African and half East Indian people who descent from East Indian immigrants who arrived from other Caribbean nations, such Martinique and Guadeloupe and African slave descendants. Most present-day descendants of the original Marabou are mostly of African in ancestry.

The country also has a sizable Chinese-Haitian population. One of the country's most notable Afro-Asians is the late painter Edouard Wah who was born to an Afro-Haitian mother and a Chinese immigrant father. There are a small number of residents that have Japanese ancestry as well.

Peru

About 100,000 Cantonese coolies (almost all males) in 1849 to 1874 migrated to Peru and intermarried with Peruvian women of European, African, Amerindian, mestizo and mulatto origin. Many Peruvian Chinese today are of mixed Spanish, Amerindian and Chinese lineages. Among this population exist many of African slave lineage. Estimates for the Chinese-Peruvian population range from about 1.3–1.6 million. Asian-Peruvians are estimated to be 3% of the population, but one source places the number of citizens with some Chinese ancestry at 4.2 million, which equates to 15% of the country's total population.

Brazil

Brazil has the largest Japanese community outside Japan and a large Chinese and Korean minority as well. The country's brown population, which includes mixed race mestizo and mulatto Brazilians, is almost half of the entire population and it also includes people of Eurasian, Gypsy and indigenous descent. Interracial marriages between Asians, mostly Japanese and Brazilians of African descent are less common than those between East Asians and Brazilians of European, Arab and Jewish descent, which are not uncommon and known as hāfu or ainoko. Most East Asians live in São Paulo and Paraná. Afro-Asians can be found in Rio de Janeiro, where there is a sizeable Chinese minority as well as a Vietnamese and Indonesian population, and Bahia, where the majority of black people live.

The West Indies

In the 1860s, East Indian and Chinese immigrants arrived in the West Indies as indentured servants. Chinese male laborers and migrants went to Peru, Cuba, Haiti, Guyana, Suriname, Jamaica and Trinidad where they often intermarried with local black women which resulted in a large population of racially mixed children. According to the 1946 Census from Jamaica and Trinidad alone, 12,394 Chinese were located between Jamaica and Trinidad. 5,515 of those who lived in Jamaica were Chinese-Jamaican, also known as "Chinese colored" (Chinese mixed race) and another 3,673 were Chinese-Trinidadians (Chinese colored) living in Trinidad. The Chinese men who married African women in Guyana and Trinidad Tobago were mostly Cantonese, while the Chinese men who married African women in Jamaica were mostly Hakka but with a large minority of Cantonese men. In her book and documentary Finding Samuel Lowe: China, Jamaica, Harlem, Afro-Chinese-Jamaican-American Paula Williams Madison explores her grandfather's life and travels. The journey ends with the reunion of the author's immediate relatives with their newly discovered extended family in Guangdong, China. 1871 the census was recorded at a population of 506,154 people, 246,573 of which were males and 259,581 females. Their races were recorded as 13,101 White people, 100,346 Coloured (mixed Black and White) and 392,707 Black people with a minority making up other races.

Many thousands males of Europeans, Indian, Chinese descent married local Black African women. Pub Med results were also issued in the same year (2012): "Our results reveal that the studied population of Jamaica exhibit a predominantly South-Saharan paternal component, with haplogroups A1b-V152, A3-M32, B2-M182, E1a-M33, E1b1a-M2, E2b-M98, and R1b2-V88 making up 66.7% of the Jamaican paternal gene pool. Yet, European derived chromosomes (i.e., haplogroups G2a*-P15, I-M258, R1b1b-M269, and T-M184) were detected at commensurate levels in Jamaica (18.9%), whereas Y-haplogroups indicative of Chinese [O-M175 (3.8%)] and Indian [H-M69 (0.6%) and L-M20 (0.6%)] ancestry were restricted to Jamaica. African paternal DNA 66.7%, European paternal DNA 18.9%, Chinese paternal DNA 3.8%, Indian paternal DNA 1.2%

In Jamaica, Guyana, Suriname and Trinidad, a percentage of the population of people are of Indian descent (from paternal Grandfather), some of whom have contributed to Afro-Asian-Caribbean children.

Guyana

Between 1853 and 1879, roughly 14,000 Chinese indentured workers arrived in British Guiana on five-year indenture contracts to work on the colony's sugar plantations. They soon integrated into the local culture, converting to Christianity and learning English. The majority of workers were unmarried men, and intermarried with local Indo-Guyanese and Afro-Guyanese women.

Trinidad and Tobago

The country is known for having a large Indian population stemming from the 18th and 19th-century colonial plantation economy and people of Indian descent now make up a narrow plurality. In Trinidad and Tobago, persons of African-Indian mixed descent are called "douglas". One of the country's most notable Afro-Asians is its former President George Maxwell Richards and singer Nicki Minaj.

United States

In 1882, the Chinese Exclusion Act was passed and Chinese workers who chose to stay in the U.S. could no longer be with their wives who stayed behind in China. Because White Americans looked at Chinese labor workers as stealing employment, they were harassed and discriminated against. Many Chinese men settled in black communities in states such as Mississippi and, in turn, married black women. In the mid-19th to 20th centuries, hundreds of thousands of Chinese men in the U.S., mostly of Cantonese origin from Taishan, migrated to the United States. Anti-miscegenation laws in many states prohibited Chinese men from marrying white women. After the Emancipation Proclamation, many intermarriages in some states were not recorded and historically, Chinese-American men married African-American women in high proportions to their total marriage numbers due to few Chinese-American women being in the United States. After the Emancipation Proclamation, many Chinese-Americans immigrated to the Southern states, particularly Arkansas, to work on plantations. For example, in 1880, the tenth US Census of Louisiana alone counted 57% of interracial marriages between these Chinese Americans to be with African Americans and 43% to be with European-American women. Between 20 and 30 percent of the Chinese who lived in Mississippi married black women before 1940. In a genetic study of 199 samples from African-American males found one belong to haplogroup O2a (or 0.5%).

U.S. Census reports
According to the 2010 United States Census, there are 185,595 people of Native African or African-American and Asian descent in the United States. Reports further offer the following break-down of all groups having Native African or African-American and Asian descent:

Central Asia

Afghanistan
Among the ethnic Hazara people who were descendants of Mongol invaders who mixed with the Iranian population it detected Sub-Saharan African lineages in both the paternal and maternal ancestry of Hazara there's 5.1% of African Y-DNA B and 7.5% of African mtDNA haplogroup L. The origin and date of when these admixture occurred are unknown but was believed to have been during the slave trades in Afghanistan.

East Asia

China
Currently, Afro-Asian births are on the rise resulting from the arrival of African students in cities such as Nanjing, Hangzhou and Shanghai. Another contributing factor is the strengthened trade relationships between Africa and China which have invited an influx of African immigrants into China, primarily Nigerians who have formed a small, yet progressive, community in the country. In October 2010, Chinese officials estimated about 500 mixed marriages between Africans and Chinese. In places such as Guangzhou, a progressive population of about 10,000 African entrepreneurs continues to thrive.

Majority of the Chinese who live and marry Africans in Guangzhou come from the poorer provinces Sichuan, Hunan and Hubei.

China's new emerging population of Afro-Asians also includes Pate and Lamu Island descendants of ancient shipwrecked Chinese explorers. Awarded Chinese citizenship by the Chinese government, many students have been provided full scholarships to universities in China. Among China's most famous Afro-Asian natives are Shanghai-born Lou Jing who, in 2009, garnered national gossip as she rose to fame competing on popular reality TV show Dragon TV's Go Oriental Angel and half Chinese and half South African volleyball player Ding Hui.

By 2020, there are an estimated 500,000 Africans living in China, with the majority residing in Guangzhou.

Japan

In recent history, the hike in the African-Japanese population has been linked to the American occupation of Japan following the end of World War II, where African-Japanese children were born through either prostitution or legally binding marriage. Thus, over the years, an increased number of African-American male/Japanese female unions has produced a culturally mixed African-American and Japanese population living in Japan. Once given preferential treatment during the American military presence in Japan, the currently biracial population faces some severe public backlash and marginalization due to the reemergence of ethnic-based nationalism in Japan. These unions between Asian women and American G.I.s have also contributed to the increase of the Afro-Asian orphan population. In some cases many Asian wives accompanied their husbands in returning to and settling in the United States. Subsequently, many African-Japanese are products of unions between Native Japanese and continental Africans due to the increased numbers of immigrant Africans.

Notable people

Notable African-Japanese include American author and playwright Velina Hasu Houston who was born in territorial waters off the coast of Japan to a native-born Japanese mother of partial Japanese ancestry and an African-American father. Popular American-born enka singer Jero was born into a multi-generational African-Japanese-American family and immigrated back to the birth country of his grandmother. He has become one of the most famous Black/African descendants in the country. There is also native-born wrestler Aja Kong, former professional basketball player Michael Takahashi and pop/R&B singer Thelma Aoyama who were all born to Japanese mothers and African-American fathers. Current Washington Wizards forward Rui Hachimura was born to a Japanese mother and Beninese father. Sprinter Asuka Cambridge was born to a Japanese mother and a Jamaican father.

Afro-fusion in Japanese media
Other notable African descendants in Japanese media include singer Crystal Kay and beauty queen Ariana Miyamoto.

South Korea
The U.S. deployment of forces to South Korea between 1950 and 1954 resulted in a multitude of Afro-Asian births, mostly between native South Korean women and African-American servicemen. While many of these births have been to married African-American and Korean interracial couples, others have been born out-of-wedlock through prostitution. Already facing the dilemma of 85,000 children left homeless throughout the country after the Korean War, South Korea saw a spike in orphaned Afro-Korean infants.
Often, the Afro-Korean orphans were purposely starved, as the society deemed mixed-raced children less worthy of food needed by non-mixed Korean children. In some areas, the mixed-raced youth were even denied education. In 1955, the U.S. State Department made a public plea asking American families to open their doors to the ostracized youth and in 1956 the Holt Adoption Program launched a gateway for Christian faith-based adoption of children of G.I. soldiers that also included Eurasian offspring. However, in addition to the race-based discrimination faced in their country of birth, Afro-Korean orphans were still passed over by adopting American families based on skin color preferences. There is also a general stigma placed on Afro-Koreans based on illegitimacy, low socio-economic status, low educational attainment and aesthetics.

Notable Koreans of African descent:

Europe

United Kingdom

The British Mixed-Race population includes some Afro-Asian people. This ancestry may stem from a multi-generational mixed Caribbean lineage, as well as interracial unions between Asians and Africans from prominent populations such as British Indians and British Nigerians. Notable Afro-Asian Britons include multigenerational Afro-Chinese-Caribbean-descended Naomi Campbell, first generation biracial Iranian-Ghanaian-descended actress Freema Agyeman and first generation biracial Indo-Caribbean-descended musician David Jordan.

South Asia

India

The Siddi, also known as Sidi, Siddhi, Sheedi or Habshi, are an ethnic group inhabiting India. The first members of the community arrived on the subcontinent in 628 AD at the port of Bharuch. Others followed in their footsteps during the Muslim conquests beginning in 712 AD. The latter group are believed to have been serving under Muhammad bin Qasim's army, and were called Zanjis.

Some Siddis escaped slavery to establish communities in forested areas, and some also established the small Siddi principalities of Janjira State on Janjira Island and Jafarabad State in Kathiawar as early as the twelfth century. A former alternative name of Janjira was Habshan (i.e., land of the Habshis). In the Delhi Sultanate period prior to the rise of the Mughals in India, Jamal-ud-Din Yaqut was a prominent Siddi slave-turned-nobleman who was a close confidant of Razia Sultana (1235–1240 CE). Although this is disputed, he may also have been her lover, but contemporary sources do not indicate that this was necessarily the case.

Siddis were also brought as slaves by the Deccan Sultanates. Several former slaves rose to high ranks in the military and administration, the most prominent of which was Malik Ambar. The majority of them reside in Karnataka, Gujarat and Hyderabad. Siddis are primarily Muslims, although some are Hindus and others belong to the Catholic Church.

Pakistan

The Siddis, also known as Makranis, also inhabit Pakistan. They are descended from Bantu peoples from the African Great Lakes region. Some were merchants, sailors and mercenaries. Others were indentured servants, but the vast majority were brought to the Indian subcontinent as slaves by Portuguese and Arab merchants. The Siddi community is currently estimated at around 20,000–55,000 individuals with the cities of Makran and Karachi serving as the main population centres for them. Siddis in Pakistan are primarily Sufi Muslims.

Narang et al. (2011) examined the autosomal DNA of Siddis in Pakistan. According to the researchers, about 58% of the Siddis' ancestry is derived from Bantu peoples. The remainder is associated with local Indo-European-speaking North and Northwest Indian populations, due to recent admixture events. However, Guha et al. (2012) observed few genetic differences between the Makrani of Pakistan and adjacent populations. According to the authors, the genome-wide ancestry of the Makrani was essentially the same as that of the neighboring Indo-European-speaking Balochi and Dravidian-speaking Brahui.

Sri Lanka

The Sri Lanka Kaffirs are an ethnic group in Sri Lanka who are partially descended from 16th-century Portuguese traders and Bantu slaves with additional admixture from ethnic Sri Lankans who were brought by them to work as labourers and soldiers to fight against the Sinhala Kings. They are very similar to the Zanj-descended populations in Iraq and Kuwait, and are known in Pakistan as Sheedis and in India as Siddis. The Kaffirs spoke a distinctive creole based on Portuguese, the Sri Lanka Kaffir language, now extinct. Their cultural heritage includes the dance styles Kaffringna and Manja and their popular form of dance music Baila.

The term Kaffir is said to mean 'non-believer'. It does not hold the same meaning in Sri Lanka as it does in countries like South Africa, where it is used as a racial slur.

Southeast Asia

Philippines

Most older Afro-Filipinos were born from African-American G.I. and Filipino parentage. More recently, the Overseas Filipino Worker communities have produced interracial marriages with people of African descent in the Americas or Europe, resulting in Afro-Filipinos who may return to the country as natural born Filipinos. In 2011, The Nigerian Family Association notified the Republic of the Philippines Department of Foreign Affairs of its formation, opening membership to a growing number interracial Nigerian-Filipino/Filipino-Nigerian families and their children, living in the country.

Afro-Filipinos are not subject to socio-economical, cultural or political marginalization within Philippine society as other Afro-Asians may experience within more xenophobic neighboring Asian countries. This unique acceptance of Afro-Asians and biracials within the Philippines may be down to the full social integration of Afro-Asians who speak Philippine languages natively, Filipino familiarity with Aetas and other Negrito indigenous Filipinos who share some facial features and skin tones with Afro-Filipinos, popular affiliation to African-American culture and music as a relatable and non-colonial subculture or positive Afro-Filipino representation internationally, reflecting their patriotism and affinity to the Philippines.

Their social positions vary widely, with some living in poor or working class areas, while most are lower middle or upper middle class citizens. Most Afro-Filipinos live in and around Metro Manila, Calabarzon, Metro Cebu, or in Olongapo, Clark or Angeles cities in Central Luzon around the former American bases.

Many Afro-Filipinos represent the Philippines in international events like Kristina Knott and gold medalist Eric Cray (African-American-Filipino) in the 30th SEA games held in the Philippines in 2019 or Mau Marcelo, winner of Philippine Idol 2006. Afro-Filipino sportsmen gain popularity within the highly popular Philippine Basketball Association or on local TV and in the hospitality sectors.

Among the country's most recognizable Afro-Asians are half African-American/Filipino R&B singers Jaya, Mau Marcelo and Luke Mejares.

Singapore
Mixed marriages between ethnic Asians and foreigners are becoming more common in Singapore. While most mixed marriages between ethnic Asians and foreigners involve marriages between Europeans and Asians, some marriages have involved Africans and Asians. Afro-Asians born out of these mixed marriages have added to the mixed race population of Singapore. The 2014 Miss Singapore Universe finalist Ijechi Nazirah Nwaozuzu is Afro-Asian. Her mother is Malay with additional Portuguese, Indian and Chinese ancestry and her father is Nigerian.

Vietnam
During the Vietnam War, African-American servicemen had children with local Vietnamese women. Some of these children were abandoned by the Vietnamese family or sent to orphanages. Many orphans and children were airlifted to adopting families in the United States in 1975 during "Operation Babylift" before the fall of South Vietnam. The Afro-Vietnamese (or Afro-Amerasian) children suffered much discrimination in Vietnam at that time. There was also some controversy as to how these orphaned Afro-Amerasian children were placed in new homes in the United States.

West Asia

Saudi Arabia

According to The World Factbook, around 10% of Saudi Arabia's population is of Afro-Asian descent. Most Afro-Asians living in Saudi Arabia are Afro-Arabs, who occasionally face discrimination due to their dark skin. Marriages between Saudi Arabs and Sub-Saharan Africans are quite common in Saudi Arabia.

See also

 Afro-Arab
 Afro-Iranians
 Afro-Turks
 Eurasian (mixed ancestry)

References

Africa

Congo

Equatorial Guinea

Kenya

Madagascar

Nigeria

South Africa

The Americas

United States

Mississippi

The Caribbean

Cuba

Jamaica

South America

Peru

East Asia

China

Japan

South Korea

Europe

South Asia

Pakistan

Sri Lanka

Southeast Asia

Philippines

Vietnam

External links
 The Indian Diaspora at UCLA
 Manas project
 African and Asian connections in history

Multiracial affairs
People of Asian descent
People of African descent